The 17th Central Committee of the Chinese Communist Party was elected by the 17th Congress on 21 October 2007, and sat until the 18th National Congress in 2012. The 17th CC is composed of full members and alternate members. It was followed by the 18th Central Committee of the Chinese Communist Party. A member has voting rights, while an alternate does not. If a full member is removed from the CC the vacancy is then filled by an alternate member at the next committee plenum — the alternate member who received the most confirmation votes in favour is highest on the order of precedence. To be elected to the Central Committee, a candidate must be a party member for at least five years.

Keys

Plenums

Apparatus

Heads of department-level institutions

Heads of Institutions Directly Under the Central Committee

Membership

Legend

Members
Notes:
 The Listing column is listed in accordance with the official ordering.

Alternates
Notes:
 The individuals below are listed according to the number of votes in favour received at the Party Congress that elected the committee; if the number of votes in favour they received were the same, they are ordered by the number of strokes in their surnames.

Notes

References

Citations

Sources 
 General
Plenary sessions, apparatus heads, ethnicity, the Central Committee member- and alternate membership, Politburo membership, Secretariat membership, Central Military Commission members, Standing Committee of the Central Commission for Discipline Inspection membership, Central Commission for Discipline Inspection, offices an individual held, retirement, if the individual in question is military personnel, female, has been expelled, is currently under investigation or has retired:
 
  
  
  
  
  
  
  
  
  
   Note: For information on individual members (such as work history, birthdate, or ethnicity), press on their names (which will lead you to a page devoted to that specific individual).
   Note: ''For information on individual members (such as work history, birthdate, or ethnicity), search their name (in Chinese) and you will be transported directly to a page devoted to them.

 Articles and journals
 

Central Committee of the Chinese Communist Party
2007 establishments in China
2012 disestablishments in China